The Great Wide World of Quincy Jones is an album by Quincy Jones that was released by Mercury.

Reception 

The AllMusic review by Scott Yanow called it "a top-notch bop-oriented big band".

Track listing 
 "Lester Leaps In" (Lester Young) - 3:33
 "Ghana" (Ernie Wilkins) - 4:36
 "Caravan" (Juan Tizol, Duke Ellington, Irving Mills) - 3:28
 "Everybody's Blues" (Wilkins) - 4:13
 "Cherokee (Indian Love Song)" (Ray Noble) - 3:05
 "Air Mail Special" (Benny Goodman, Charlie Christian, Jimmy Mundy) - 2:33
 "They Say It's Wonderful" (Irving Berlin) - 3:21
 "Chant of the Weed" (Don Redman) - 3:14
 "I Never Has Seen Snow" (Harold Arlen, Truman Capote) - 3:08
 "Eesom" (Bill Potts) - 5:04

Personnel 
Quincy Jones - conductor
Art Farmer, Lennie Johnson, Jimmy Maxwell, Lee Morgan, Ernie Royal, Nick Travis - trumpet
Billy Byers, Jimmy Cleveland, Urbie Green, Frank Rehak - trombone
Julius Watkins - French horn
Porter Kilbert, Phil Woods - alto saxophone
Budd Johnson - tenor saxophone
Jerome Richardson - tenor saxophone, flute, piccolo
Sahib Shihab - baritone saxophone
Patti Bown - piano
Les Spann - guitar, flute
Buddie Jones, Buddy Catlett - bass
Don Lamond - drums
Ralph Burns (track 8), Al Cohn (tracks 6 & 7), Bill Potts (tracks 3, 9 & 10), Ernie Wilkins (tracks 1, 2, 4 & 5) - arranger

References 

1959 albums
Mercury Records albums
Quincy Jones albums
Albums arranged by Ernie Wilkins
Albums arranged by Ralph Burns